Montresor may refer to:

People
 Montresor (surname)
Claude de Bourdeille, comte de Montrésor (c. 1606–1663), French aristocrat

Other uses
Montresor, character in "The Cask of Amontillado"
Montresor, the bat ridden by "Iron Tail" in the children's movie  Here Comes Peter Cottontail
Montrésor, a commune in the Indre-et-Loire department in central France
Château de Montrésor, a medieval castle in that commune
Randall's Island, called Montresor's Island in the 18th century, an island in the East River in New York City